"Asphodel, That Greeny Flower" is a poem by American poet William Carlos Williams. It was published in 1955 as part of Williams's anthology Journey to Love.

Notes

Poetry by William Carlos Williams
1955 poems